Ulrich Lederer (18 August 1897 – 3 June 1969) was an Austrian ice hockey player. He competed in the men's tournament at the 1928 Winter Olympics.

References

1897 births
1969 deaths
Ice hockey players at the 1928 Winter Olympics
Olympic ice hockey players of Austria
Sportspeople from Opava